The Culicoidini is a tribe of biting midges.

Genera include:
Austroconops
Culicoides
Neoculicoides
Paradasyhelea

It is not quite clear which taxa should be considered full genera, and which ones mere subgenera and included in Culicoides.

References 

Ceratopogonidae
Veterinary entomology
Nematocera tribes